(German for sentence, movement, set, setting) is any single member of a musical piece, which in and of itself displays a complete sense, (Riemann 1976: 841) such as a sentence, phrase, or movement.

Notes

Sources
Riemann (1976). Cited in Nattiez, Jean-Jacques (1990). Music and Discourse: Toward a Semiology of Music (Musicologie générale et sémiologue, 1987). Translated by Carolyn Abbate (1990). .

Formal sections in music analysis
German words and phrases